Frank Robert Verwey (born 21 January 1941) is a South African professional golfer.

Verwey was born in Johannesburg and is the son of former South African PGA champion Jock Verwey. He is also the brother-in-law of South African golf legend Gary Player, who was married to his sister, Vivienne, deceased 2021.

Verwey won the 1962 German Open and the 1965 Almaden Open Invitational on the PGA Tour. He was a member of the European Tour from 1978 to 1980. He won several professional tournaments in his home country and represented South Africa in the World Cup in 1978 and 1980.

Verwey was 50 years, 5 months and 23 days old when he won the Senior British Open Championship becoming the youngest player to ever win that event. He was a regular on the European Seniors Tour for the first few years after its establishment in 1992, and finished in the top ten on the Order of Merit four times.

Professional wins

PGA Tour wins (1)

South African circuit wins (5) 

1963 Western Province Open
1965 Transvaal Open
1968 Pepsi Open (South Africa)
1969 Transvaal Open
1975 Transkei Open (South Africa)

Other regular career wins (1)
1962 German Open

Senior PGA Tour wins (1)

European Senior Tour wins (4)

European Senior Tour playoff record (1–1)

Other senior wins (1)
2000 Nippon Jurin Senior Open (Japan)

Results in major championships

CUT = missed the half-way cut
WD = withdrew
"T" indicates a tie for a place

Senior major championships

Wins (1)

Team appearances
World Cup (representing South Africa): 1978, 1980
Praia d'El Rey European Cup: 1998 (tie)

References

External links

South African male golfers
Sunshine Tour golfers
European Tour golfers
European Senior Tour golfers
Winners of senior major golf championships
Golfers from Johannesburg
1941 births
Living people